The following describes many of the more noteworthy recurring segments and characters on GMA Network's gag show Bubble Gang.

Recurring segments

Ang Dating Doon

Ang Dating Doon (English: What Used to Be There) is a popular recurring segment on GMA Network's gag show Bubble Gang from 1998 to 1999. It was briefly revived in 2001 and 2005. The show experienced a resurfacing in late 2011 and is broadcast once a month. It is a parody of the longest-running religious television and radio program in the Philippines, Ang Dating Daan (English: The Old Path), which is produced by the Members Church of God International. At first, the nursery rhyme "Row Row Row Your Boat" was the opening and closing theme used from 1998 to 1999. In the same year, however, it comically began to use instead of the opening theme of the anime television series Chōdenji Machine Voltes V ("Voltes V no Uta" by Mitsuko Horie, Koorogi '73 and Columbia Cradle Club), as both its opening and closing song. It was of perfect timing since it was a way of promoting Voltes V for the network back then.

Origins
The sketch was headlined by the show's writers, Isko Salvador (as Brod Pete, a play on the name of the actor Brad Pitt and a parody of Bro. Eli Soriano, Overall Servant of MCGI and the host of Ang Dating Daan), Cesar Cosme (as Brother Willy, a parody of Bro. Willy Santiago, who in 2009 broke away from MCGI and established the Members Church of God in Jesus Christ Worldwide), and Chito Francisco (as Brother Jocel, a parody of Bro. Josel Mallari). The recent popularity of the religious program Ang Dating Daan and its segment, Itanong mo kay Soriano, Biblia ang Sasagot!, (Ask Bro Eli, the Bible Will Answer!), inspired the segment. Because of its popularity, their characters became their nicknames.

Format
The segment would commonly begin and end with Voltes V no Uta  as the theme song; afterward, various members of the audience would come up and present various questions to Brod Pete, who then has Brother Willy read various extracts from Nursery Rhymes or Folk songs, and recently on the 2011 revival, various song lyrics. Brod Pete will then interpret the "passage" to answer the question presented. Instead of using the Bible, they used dictionary, phone directory, or any other books. In the 2011 revival, they began to use MacBook Pros and iPads as reference materials, which leads to its new title, Ang Bagong Dating Doon (The New Formerly There), meaning "Ang Dating Doon" with the power of technology.

On the June 27, 2014, episode of Bubble Gang, the segment sported a new set, the trio now wearing suits, and the name tweaked to Ang Bagong Dating Doon International (The New Formerly There International). This change reflects the new formats of Ang Dating Daan and Itanong Mo Kay Soriano, wherein MCGI's Mass Indoctrinations and Worldwide Bible Expositions, respectively, replaced the previous ones, since Bro. Eli Soriano went into exile in 2010.

Various exclamations such as "Alien!" or Raise the Roof! would also be used (as a parody of the common exclamations Amen and Praise the Lord).

A running gag in the show is that Brother Jocel sleeps during the segment proper (he is often seen with his head resting on his arms on the desk, though this has not been the case on some episodes). In the 2011 revival and onwards, he is sometimes seen playing games with his iPad, most notably, according to him, is Temple Run, or checking his "Facebook account" for status updates (while often seen still resting his head on the desk).

Notes
 Isko Salvador and Cesar Cosme once worked on the legendary sitcom John En Marsha.
 There are also brief revivals of Ang Dating Doon since the first incarnation of the segment ended. First, when Isko Salvador went to ABS-CBN and became a regular of the gag show Klasmeyts, he revived Ang Dating Doon but with a variation. The segment features the same concept and the same usage of exclamations "Alien" and "Raise the Roof," but changes the segment title into "Doon Dati" (also meaning "Formerly There") in reference to the segment's tenure in Bubble Gang. The theme song was also changed from Voltes V opening theme to the opening theme of Tōshō Daimos ("Tate! Tōshō Daimos" by Isao Sasaki and Columbia Cradle Club). In a satire of the then-heated rivalry between Ang Dating Daan and Iglesia ni Cristo, Doon Dati has a sister segment named "May Tama Kami" ("We Are Nuts", lit. "We Are Correct"), a parody of Iglesia ni Cristo show Ang Tamang Daan. Hosted by Bayani Agbayani and Herbert Bautista, who play as parodies of Bro. Michael Sandoval and Bro. Maximo Bularan, Jr., the show focuses on rebuking Brod. Pete's teachings through nursery rhymes and children's folk tales in a similar manner to Brod Pete's.
 The comedy show Ispup made a parody of Ang Dating Daan and its rival Ang Tamang Daan entitled Ang Sangang Daan ("The Branched-Out Path"), hosted by John Lapus and Leo Martinez. It was shown on TV5, then known as ABC 5.
 There is also another segment based on Ang Dating Doon, this time calling it Ang Daming Daan ("Many Paths" or "Many Hundreds"), which was shown on ABC's gag show Teka Mona! This segment was hosted by Joey de Leon as Bro. Elvis Soriano (a parody of Bro. Eli Soriano with an Elvis Presley look), who is usually seen with his guitar, and Mike "Pekto" Nacua as Brother Hud, Bro. Elvis' Judas Iscariot-like assistant (his name was a pun on the word "brotherhood"). the concept was as same as Ang Dating Doon, except for the fact that every question is worth P100.00 and it will be put into a fishbowl after the question was answered (a parody of one of the accusations to MCGI by INC wherein Bro. Eli allegedly charges his followers with a large sum of money).
 The Trio made a cameo appearance at the film D'Sisters Nuns of the Above starring Michael V and Vic Sotto and Tweets For My Sweet.
 Despite having a show in Bubble Gang, Brod Pete (Isko Salvador) became a judge in It's Showtime.
 Brod. Pete is also a segment host for the UNTV show Klasrum (formerly as Bread Tambayan). Ironically, UNTV is the current home of Ang Dating Daan, and UNTV is operated by Breakthrough and Milestones Productions International (led by its chairman and CEO "Kuya" Daniel Razon, nephew of Eli Soriano and the Assistant Overall Servant of MCGI) which is under the Broadcast ministry of MCGI.

Discography

Recurring characters

Anniversary editions
 Bubble Gang Year 4 - 4th anniversary. The special, which took place in front of a live audience at Phenomena, Quezon City, featured the show's famous sketches at that time such as Ang Dating Doon (1999).
 The New Bubble Gang - 7th anniversary. A 2-part anniversary special, the first one featured an awarding event for the past commercial spoofs. The second part featured a special concert (2002).
 BG8 - 8th anniversary. The month-long special including the second part featured the show pays tribute to the past gag shows on Philippine Television and the third part featured a special concert held at the Aliw Theater with Parokya Ni Edgar as a guest. (2003)
 Bubble Gang sa Japan - 9th anniversary. For the first time in the show's history, the cast and crew went outside the country to shoot their sketches. The special was filmed in Japan (2004).
 Bubble Gang X – 10th anniversary. X is a reference to the Roman equivalent of 10. The special featured sketches joined by guests such as Charee Padilla, Pekto and Bearwin Meily. The actual cast of Encantadia appeared and portrayed a comical face-off with their Pinkantadia (spoof on Encantadia) counterparts (2005).
 Bubble Gang 11 - 11th anniversary. The special featured guests such as Joey De Leon, Eddie Garcia, Janno Gibbs, Dennis Trillo, Richard Gutierrez, Angel Locsin, Sen. Bong Revilla and music icons, Regine Velasquez, Ryan Cayabyab and Parokya ni Edgar (2006).
 DO-SE-NA - 12th anniversary. 1st action-musical-comedy television film. A 2-part anniversary special, the high-definition (HD) film featured original songs composed by Michael V. The story revolves around 2 detectives (portrayed by Michael V. and Ogie Alcasid) who gets involved in different adventures ranging from serious to the most hilarious. The title refers to the Spanish "dozena" meaning a set of 12 (2007).
 Bubble Gang 13th Anniversary: A Musical Presentation - 13th anniversary. The special featured live performances in front of an audience at Center Stage, SM Mall of Asia, Pasay (2008). 
 14 Going Steady - 14th anniversary. A 2-part anniversary special, the first one featured a special interview with the former and present cast about the long history, best memories, trivia and behind-the-scene look on the show. The second part featured three television films: a horror-comedy film (Tya Ring), a sex comedy film (Dingdong Lang Ang Pagitan) and a Koreanovela spoof (Tim Song Ko). Dennis Trillo, Iza Calzado, Julia Clarete and Regine Velasquez were the celebrity guests (2009).
 Bubble Gang Sa Japan Katoru Sei Na - continuation of the show's 14th anniversary. As the name implies, the cast and crew shot two episodes in Japan, which they already visited before. Katoru Sei Na is a Romanized parody of the word "Katorse na" meaning "We are 14 years" (2009).
 Bungalow - 15th anniversary (Crystal year). This horror-comedy-musical special paid tribute to the King of OPM Novelty, singer, composer and comedian, Yoyoy Villame. A television film, its story was based on Villame's song Bungalow, which is about a young man's horrifying experience after inheriting a haunted Bungalow from a deceased relative. The Halloween presentation, headlined by Michael V. and Ogie Alcasid, also featured its own version of other songs by Villame. The special introduced Jackie Rice, Gwen Zamora, Ellen Adarna and Sam Pinto as the new additions to the Bubble Gang cast. The four actresses were collectively known as Bubblets. (2010)
 Bubble Gang Kin-Z – continuation of the show's 15th anniversary. The show introduced a new OBB which parodied the anime Dragon Ball Z and also references both the Spanish word "quince" (15), as well as Gen Z. (2010)
 Bubble Gang 4x4 – 16th anniversary. The 2-part special featured, for the first time in its history, music videos based on the show's well-known sketches, characters, commercial spoofs and parodies through the years. The guests were Mike Enriquez, Arnold Clavio, Heart Evangelista and Dennis Trillo. The title is a reference to the 4x4 van and also the multiplication factors resulting to 16 (2011).
 Bubble Gang Diz Is Siete – 17th anniversary. Instead of a standard gag show, it showcases a collection of "indie films" that consist of drama, action and horror (all of which, of course, added with comedy). The title is both a play on the words "Diz Iz It!", a former talent show from GMA Network as well as Michael Jackson's "This Is It" supposed concert in 2009 as well as on the Spanish word "diecisiete", meaning 17. (2012)
 Bubble Gang Barely Legal – 18th anniversary. The 2-part special featured live performances in front of an audience and mimicked the concept of having a bar comedy show, pole-dancing performance, late-night party wherein only 18+ customers are allowed to watch. The phrase is a reference of the legal age of majority of a person. The special also introduced new additions to the cast, known as the Bagong Gang. (2013)
 Bubble Gang XIX 19 B.C. - 19th anniversary. The phrase is a pun on the Roman numeral for 19 and the phrase "19 B.C.". The title card, OBB and featured gags of the special are parodies of Ancient Greco-Roman-inspired historical war films such as "300" and "Gladiator". The special featured gags, spoofs sketches wherein the characters collaborated with the characters of other shows of GMA network. It is noted for having a lot of celebrity personalities as special guests. (2014)
IMBG 20 - 20th anniversary (Emerald year). A documentary special, in coordination with GMA News and Public Affairs, which tackled Bubble Gang's long history in a span of two decades. The documentary was hosted by Mike Enriquez and Jessica Soho and also featured an interview with the present and former cast and crew. The show also celebrated its emerald anniversary by launching two commemorative books, a first in its history, at Gateway Cineplex while the documentary special is airing on different parts of the country. The documentary title, which means I AM Bubble Gang, is a pun of the movie website IMDb and the cast pictorial parodies Anonymous's famous pose, standing in unison in a circle. (2015).
21 Gang Salute - 21st anniversary. The phrase is a pun on 21-gun salute, a custom of military honor by firing ammunitions. The two-part special honors 21 Filipino iconic comedians who inspired Bubble Gang and the Philippine's style of comedy through the years. It featured live performances of sketches in front of an audience. (2016).
Parokya Bente Dos - 22nd anniversary. The show aired its first-ever romance-comedy-musical theater play which is based on songs from the OPM Rock band, Parokya Ni Edgar. (2017).The musical is about a man named Buloy, portrayed by Michael V. who has a crush on actress Birdie Aguila, portrayed by Kim Domingo and how Buloy got his dream girl in the end. Birdie's abusive boyfriend, Uno Suave,portrayed by Paolo Contis and his bodyguards portrayed by Antonio Aquitania, Boy2 Quizon, and Mikael Daez stand as the antagonists in the story. The anniversary special also aired an episode which featured behind-the-scene moments and how the cast and crew prepared on the musical stage play.
Bente Tres Oras - 23rd anniversary. The show aired an action-comedy-adventure television film which is a crossover of different characters from different sketches of the show. The cast and crew shot the film in studio and on outside locations. The title is a parody of GMA's newscast 24 Oras.
The Scavengers (24th anniversary) – It is a parody of the Avengers film series. In this two-part special, the Scavengers fight Allan Peter Kuya Thanos (Michael V.), a parody of Thanos and politician Alan Peter Cayetano, at different plots. It also featured guests, including: Manila mayor Isko Moreno and a Filipino-American actor Jacob Batalon.
 Ka-BUBBLE Mula Noon, 'GANG Ngayon - 25th Anniversary (Silver Year). Due to COVID-19 restrictions, the show opted to postpone its 25th-anniversary presentation by one year and merge 2 separate anniversary specials into a simple yet rare and emotional episode. The special episode technically celebrates 26 years of Bubble Gang, but it was marketed as the 25th anniversary to give more emphasis to its silver milestone. The presentation is a first in Bubble Gang history as it involved remakes of classic sketches, performed by the new cast and special guests, which were composed of some of the former cast and long-time fans of the show. Moreover, the fans, known as mga Ka-Bubble or Ka-Babol, were interviewed by the cast themselves and they also received 25 thousand pesos each from the show as a form of gratitude and to highlight the emotional tone of the episode, which is the first anniversary special during the COVID-19 pandemic era. Health protocols were followed and some of the sketches were shot in the studio and remote locations. Michael V also wrote and performed a special song to narrate the 25-year history of the show and to give warm tribute to the loyal fans who still watch the program. The silver presentation was also dedicated to the show's director, Bert De Leon, who died just a few days before the airing date.
 Venti 7 - 27th Anniversary. - The two-part special with the viral TikTok creators and vloggers as special guests. it was taped at Aqua Planet in Clark Freeport Zone, Pampanga. The title references the words Venti (a 24-ounce coffee on Starbucks), bente (Spanish word for twenty), and twenty itself (which rhymes with both Venti and bente).

See also
 List of GMA Network shows

References

Bubble gang